Evalina van Putten (born 1992) is a Curaçaoan beauty pageant titleholder who was crowned Miss Curaçao 2011 and Reina Hispanoamericana 2011 and also represented her country in Miss Universe 2011.

Pageants
Van Putten competed in Curaçao's national beauty pageant, Miss Curaçao, held in Willemstad.  She finished as the 1st finalist, behind winner Monifa Jansen, who did not meet the age requirement to participate in Miss Universe 2011.  Van Putten went instead and placed as Top 5 in the best National Costume category.

References

External links

1993 births
Living people
Curaçao beauty pageant winners
Miss Universe 2011 contestants
People from Willemstad